Long Lee  and Thwaites Brow is a suburb about one mile to the south east of the centre of the town of Keighley, West Yorkshire, England.

Features 

Long Lee is a partially rural area which encompasses a primary school, a public house, a church, a chapel, a doctor's surgery, a pharmacy, a convienence store with off-licence and a Scout Group Consisting of Beavers, Cubs and Scouts. 
It is a large residential area with many buildings ranging from bungalows to mansions.

Governance 

Long Lee is situated in the Keighley East ward of the City of Bradford Metropolitan District Council and is represented by three Labour Party Councillors. The area also forms part of the Long Lee & Parkwood ward of Keighley Town Council.

Transport 

Long Lee and Thwaites Brow are served by the Keighley Bus Company bus route K5 which connects the area with Keighley Bus Station which runs at least once an hour in both directions 7 days a week. 

Long Lee lies on the busy but unclassified road from Keighley to Harden which forms part of an alternative route to Bradford.

References

Geography of the City of Bradford
Keighley
Populated places in West Yorkshire